Scolodontidae is a taxonomic family of air-breathing land snails, terrestrial pulmonate gastropod mollusks in the superfamily Scolodontoidea.

Taxonomy
The following genera are recognised in the family Scolodontidae:

 Polygyratia Gray, 1847
 Ridleyconcha Christensen, 2020

Scolodontinae 
 Drepanostomella Bourguignat, 1889
 Happia Bourguignat, 1889 - synonym: Ammonoceras L. Pfeiffer, 1855
 Hirtudiscus Hylton Scott, 1973
 Scolodonta Doering, 1875 - type genus of the family Scolodontidae - synonym: Wayampia Tillier, 1980
 Systrophia L. Pfeiffer, 1855
 Zilchistrophia Weyrauch, 1960

Tamayoinae
 Guestieria Crosse H., 1872
 Happiella H. B. Baker, 1925 - synonym: Occultator Pilsbry, 1926
 Microhappia Thiele, 1927
 Miradiscops Baker, 1925
 Tamayoa H. B. Baker, 1925 - type genus of the subfamily Tamayoinae

Genera brought into synonymy
 Ammonoceras L. Pfeiffer, 1855: synonym of Happia Bourguignat, 1890 (non Lamarck, 1822)
 Entodina Ancey, 1887: synonym of Systrophia (Entodina) Ancey, 1887 represented as Systrophia L. Pfeiffer, 1855 (original rank)
 Occultator Pilsbry, 1926: synonym of Happiella H. B. Baker, 1925
 Ophiogyra Albers, 1850: synonym of Polygyratia Gray, 1847 (objective junior synonym)
 Ridleya Ancey, 1901: synonym of Ridleyconcha Christensen, 2020 (invalid: junior homonym of Ridleya Delage & Hérouard, 1899 [Porifera]; Ridleyconcha is a replacement name)
 Wayampia Tillier, 1980: synonym of Scolodonta Doering, 1875

References

 Hausdorf B. (2006). The systematic position of Scolodonta Döring, 1875 and Scolodontidae H. B. Baker, 1925 (Gastropoda: Pulmonata). Zoologischer Anzeiger. 245 (3/4): 161-165
 Bouchet P., Rocroi J.P., Hausdorf B., Kaim A., Kano Y., Nützel A., Parkhaev P., Schrödl M. & Strong E.E. (2017). Revised classification, nomenclator and typification of gastropod and monoplacophoran families. Malacologia. 61(1-2): 1-526.

External links